A Reclining Nair lady is a painting by the Indian artist Raja Ravi Varma. The painting features a recumbent Nair woman, believed to be the character Indulekha from a Malayalam novel, with a book open in front of her while attended by a maid. Varma draw this painting inspired from Edward Manet's painting Olympia.

See also
Raja Ravi Varma

References

1902 paintings
Raja Ravi Varma